Troy Delvon Bell (born November 10, 1980) is an American former professional basketball player in the National Basketball Association (NBA) and other leagues mostly in Europe. He is also a R&B producer. He was an All-American college player at Boston College and finished as one of the greatest players in the program's history.

High school career 
Bell played high school basketball at the Academy of Holy Angels in Richfield, Minnesota. He was a 4-year letter winner, and Mr. Basketball finalist in Minnesota. In his senior season, he averaged 39.5 points, 6.0 rebounds and 4.0 assists and led the state of Minnesota in scoring. He captured the Missota Conference Player of the Year honors as a senior.  In his senior season, his season high in scoring was 47 points, his season low in scoring was 24 points.  He scored 45 points in a win over Minnehaha Academy (Dec. 1998). Bell served as team captain as a junior and senior.  He finished his school career at Holy Angels as the career scoring leader with 2,491 points (in 97 games). In the state of Minnesota, he ranks fourth on the state's career scoring list.

College career 
Bell was an All-American at Boston College, winning a conference player of the year award, and sharing another with Troy Murphy. He ended his career breaking the record for most points scored in Boston College history with 2,632, breaking the record previously set by Dana Barros. He was named Big East Conference player of the year after both his sophomore (shared) and senior seasons, joining Troy Murphy, Richard Hamilton, Patrick Ewing, and Chris Mullin as the only players to win the award multiple times.

On January 25, 2020, Bell's number 2 was retired by Boston College.

Professional career

NBA 
Bell was drafted 16th overall by the Boston Celtics in the first round of the 2003 NBA Draft, but was traded on draft night to the Memphis Grizzlies along with Dahntay Jones for Marcus Banks and Kendrick Perkins. He played in 6 games for the Grizzlies in 2003/04 season. On October 1, 2005, the New Orleans/Oklahoma City Hornets signed Bell as a free agent, but October 18 they announced that they had waived him. He had played a total of 10 minutes in the Hornets' first two preseason games.

Those 6 games with the Grizzlies ended up being Bell's only playing time in the NBA, as his final game was played on March 26, 2004, in a 109 - 86 win over the Houston Rockets. Bell recorded 2 points, 1 turnover and 1 foul in only 4 minutes of playing time.

NBA Development League 
In 2006, Bell took up boxing while working out for the NBA.  He was selected as the 12th pick by the Albuquerque Thunderbirds in the first round of the 2006 NBA D-League draft. He was signed by the Austin Toros of the D-League when Jay Williams was waived due to injury in late December 2006.

Europe 
Two seasons after 2003–04, Bell played briefly in Spain (Real Madrid) and in Germany (Frankfurt Skyliners). For the 2007–2008 season, he signed first for the Italian Serie A team, Angelico Biella, then on 12 March 2008 moved to Fastweb Casale Monferrato. He played the 2008–2009 and 2009–2010 seasons with Gruppo Triboldi Basket, also known for sponsorship reasons as Vanoli Soresina or Vanoli Cremona, in Serie A, the top level of Italian basketball. In August 2010 he signed with Entente Orléanaise in France.

In the spring of 2011, Bell played with Trenkwalder Reggio Emilia. In 2012, he signed with Pallacanestro Sant'Antimo, a second league club in Italy. In late February 2013, Bell rejoined Trenkwalder Reggio Emilia. The contract was signed for the end of the 2012–13 season with an option for 2013–14.

Argentina 
On December 24, 2015, Bell signed with San Lorenzo of Argentina.

See also
 List of NCAA Division I men's basketball career free throw scoring leaders
 List of NCAA Division I men's basketball career scoring leaders

References

External links 
 College stats @ sportsstats.com
 

1980 births
Living people
A.S. Junior Pallacanestro Casale players
All-American college men's basketball players
Albuquerque Thunderbirds players
American expatriate basketball people in Argentina
American expatriate basketball people in France
American expatriate basketball people in Germany
American expatriate basketball people in Italy
American expatriate basketball people in Spain
American men's basketball players
Austin Toros players
Basketball players from Minneapolis
Boston Celtics draft picks
Boston College Eagles men's basketball players
Liga ACB players
Memphis Grizzlies players
Orléans Loiret Basket players
Pallacanestro Biella players
Pallacanestro Reggiana players
Point guards
Real Madrid Baloncesto players
San Lorenzo de Almagro (basketball) players
Skyliners Frankfurt players
Vanoli Cremona players